The 2021 Libera Awards took place on June 17, 2021, to recognize the best in independent music presented by the American Association of Independent Music. The nominations were announced on March 23, 2021. The years marks the tenth anniversary of the ceremony. The event was streamed live on YouTube.

A number of category changes took place for the awards. A2IM also made the "Album" categories more inclusive by renaming them "Records." A2IM also renamed a number of categories: Best Live Act to Best Live/Livestream Act; Best Mainstream Rock Album and Best Indie Rock Album to Best Rock Record; and, Best Punk/Emo Album to Best Punk Record.

Winners and nominees

Multiple wins and nominations 
Nominees with more than two nominations

Artists

Record Labels

Performances 
 Arlo Parks – "Hope"
 Black Pumas
 Fantastic Negrito – "Chocolate Samurai"
 Lecrae – "Drown"
 Lido Pimienta – "Te quiera"
 Mavis Staples – "Who Told You That"
 Phoebe Bridgers 
 Yuna – "Don't Blame It on Love"/"Crush"
 Stax Academy Rhythm Section

External links 
Official website

References 

2021 music awards
Libera Awards